Phahonyothin Road or Highway 1 is a main road in Bangkok and one of the four primary highways in Thailand, which include Mittraphap Road (Highway 2), Sukhumvit Road (Highway 3), and Phet Kasem Road (Highway 4).

History 

Phahonyothin Road was originally called "Prachathipat Road" (Thanon Prachathipat, literally "Democratic Road"), and reached just  to Don Mueang. The newly lengthened road was renamed Phahonyothin Road, in honor of General Phraya Phahol Pholphayuhasena (formerly Phot Phahonyothin), the second Prime Minister of Thailand and one of the heads of the 1932 revolution.

Route 
In Bangkok, Phahonyothin Road originates in Ratchathewi district and crosses Phaya Thai, Chatuchak, Bang Khen, Don Mueang, and Sai Mai districts before continuing into Pathum Thani Province, and on through Ayutthaya, Saraburi, Lopburi, Nakhon Sawan, Chainat, again through Nakhon Sawan, Kamphaeng Phet, Tak, Lampang, Phayao and finally Chiang Rai, ending in Mae Sai district, where it connects to Tachileik in Myanmar.

Phaholyothin Road in Bangkok is also a demarcation line between districts or sub-districts in several phases as follows:

 Thung Phaya Thai (outbound) and Thanon Phaya Thai (inbound) in Ratchathewi district, as a continuation of Phaya Thai Road, from Victory Monument to the bridge over the Khlong Samsen.
 Phaya Thai (outbound) and Samsen Nai (inbound) in Phaya Thai district throughout the entire area, from the bridge over the Khlong Samsen to the bridge over the Khlong Bang Sue (begins July 26, 2017).
 Chatuchak (outbound) and Chom Phon (inbound) in Chatuchak district from the bridge over the Khlong Bang Sue to Ratchayothin Intersection.
 Lat Yao (outbound) and Chan Kasem (inbound) in Chatuchak district from Ratchayothin to Sena Nikhom Intersections.
 Lat Yao (outbound) and Sena Nikhom (inbound) in Chatuchak district from Sena Nikhom Intersection to Thong Chanya Bridge.
 Bang Khen district (outbound) and Sai Mai district (inbound) from the bridge over the Khlong Lam Phak Chi to Saphan Mai quarter.
 Don Mueang district (outbound) and Sai Mai district (inbound) from Saphan Mai quarter to the administrative boundary line between Bangkok and Pathum Thani.

See also 
 Thai highway network
 Kunming-Bangkok Expressway

Further reading 
 Thomas fuller, "In Isolated Hills of Asia, New Roads to Speed Trade", New York Times, March 31, 2008

References 

AH1
National highways in Thailand
Streets in Bangkok
Ratchathewi district
Phaya Thai district
Chatuchak district
Bang Khen district
Don Mueang district
Pathum Thani province
Phra Nakhon Si Ayutthaya province
Saraburi province
Lopburi province
Nakhon Sawan province
Chai Nat province
Kamphaeng Phet province
Tak province
Lampang province
Phayao province
Chiang Rai province